Heliotropium ellipticum is a species of flowering plant in the family Boraginaceae, native to Ukraine, Crimea, European Russia, the Caucasus, Turkey, Iran, Central Asia, and Pakistan. It is a weed and contaminant of cumin and other herbs and spices.

References

ellipticum
Flora of Ukraine
Flora of the Crimean Peninsula
Flora of East European Russia
Flora of South European Russia
Flora of the Transcaucasus
Flora of Turkey
Flora of Iran
Flora of Central Asia
Flora of Pakistan
Plants described in 1831